Marco Ramoni (April 13, 1963 – June 8, 2010) was a recognized a translational biostatistician and bioinformatician at the Children's Hospital Informatics Program, Boston, affiliated with the Harvard-MIT Division of Health Sciences and Technology.

Biography
He trained as a bioengineer and received a PhD from a joint program between the Politecnico di Milano and the University of Pavia, Italy. He completed fellowships at the University of Massachusetts (Amherst), McGill University, and the University of Geneva. He was Associate Professor of Pediatrics and Medicine at Harvard Medical School, and he was the director of the Harvard Biomedical Cybernetics Laboratory. He co-founded the American Medical Informatics Association Summit on Translational Bioinformatics in 2008.

Dr. Ramoni was posthumously elected into the American College of Medical Informatics in 2010.

Biographical Information
Dr. Ramoni is survived by his wife, Rachel Badovinac Ramoni, who is a faculty member at Harvard Medical School.

References

External links
 Biomedical publications and collaborations
 Computer science publications
 Children's Hospital Informatics Program
 Harvard-MIT Division of Health Sciences and Technology
 Biomedical Cybernetics Laboratory

1963 births
2010 deaths
Italian bioinformaticians
McGill University alumni
University of Pavia alumni
Massachusetts Institute of Technology faculty
Harvard University faculty
University of Geneva alumni
Polytechnic University of Milan alumni